The 2002 Anaheim mayoral election was held on November 5, 2002 to elect the mayor of Anaheim, California. It saw the election of Curt Pringle.

Results

References 

Anaheim
Mayoral elections in Anaheim, California
Anaheim
November 2002 events in the United States